The 1990 Sandown 500 was an endurance race for Group 3A Touring Cars. The event was held at Sandown Park in Victoria, Australia on 9 September 1990. The race distance was 161 laps of the 3.10 km circuit, totaling 499 km. It was Round 1 of the 1990 Australian Endurance Championship and Round 1 of the 1990 Australian Manufacturers' Championship.

The race was won by Glenn Seton and George Fury driving a Ford Sierra RS500 for Peter Jackson Racing.

Divisions
Cars competed in three Divisions.
 Division 1 :
 Division 2 :
 Division 3 : Under 1600cc

Results

Top 10 Qualifiers
Although no official Top 10 run off was held during qualifying for the Sandown 500, the top 10 qualifiers were:

Race

27 cars qualified for the race and 25 started.

Note:
 NC = Not classified
 DNF = Did not finish
 DNS = Did not start

Statistics
 Pole Position - #17, Dick Johnson (Ford Sierra RS500 Cosworth), 1:15.22 
 Fastest Lap - #17, Dick Johnson (Ford Sierra RS500 Cosworth), 1:16.21

See also
1990 Australian Touring Car season

References

Motorsport at Sandown
Sandown 500
Pre-Bathurst 500